Prime of My Life is the eighth album by American soul singer-songwriter Phyllis Hyman.

It was released by Philadelphia International Records on June 11, 1991 and featured "Don't Wanna Change the World", which peaked at #1 on the US Billboard R&B chart and #68 on the Billboard Hot 100 (her only Hot 100 entry). Both the album and single were RIAA certified gold on September 24, 1992. The album charted at #10 on the Billboard R&B chart and #117 on the Billboard 200.

Prime of My Life was the final studio album released during Hyman's lifetime, after which she took her own life four years later.

Track listing

Personnel

 Donna Allen - background vocals
 Art Baron - trombone
 Steven Bernstein - trumpet
 Art Bessen - trombone
 Cynthia Biggs - background vocals
 Harry Bower - trumpet
 Randy Bowland - guitar
 Daryl Burgee - percussion
 Randy Cantor - keyboards
 Damaris Carbough - background vocals
 Roland Chambers - guitar
 Gerald Chavis - trumpet
 Lawrence Cottrell - background vocals
 Dave Darlington - bass, keyboards
 Lynn Davis - background vocals
 Curtis Dowd, Jr. - keyboards
 Sonny Emory - drums
 Charlie Ernst - synthesizer, drums, drum programming, keyboards
 Jack Faith - saxophone
 John Gitlutin - keyboards
 Steve Gordon - guitar, rhythm guitar
 Steve Green - bass, piano
 Doug Grigsby - bass, drum programming, loops, programming, keyboards, rhythm, drums
 Charlene Holloway - background vocals
 Annette Hardeman - background vocals
 Kent Hewitt - piano
 Reginald Hines - rhythm
 Phyllis Hyman - vocals, rap

 Phillip Ingram - background vocals
 Candi James - background vocals
 Josie James - background vocals
 Birch Johnson - trombone
 Mark Johnson - trombone
 Quinton Joseph - drums
 The Kerber Brothers - strings, horn
 Lambchops - synthesizer, piano
 Rhett Lawrence - keyboards
 Manny Lopez - acoustic guitar, guitar
 James Loyd - keyboards
 Karen Manno - background vocals
 Lester Mendez - keyboards
 Eddie Montilla - drums, drum programming
 Myriam Naomi Valle - background vocals
 Gene Page - strings
 Kenny Pollack - percussion, keyboards, drum programming, drums
 Donald Robinson - keyboards
 John "J.R." Robinson - drums
 Jim Salamone - percussion, drums, keyboards
 Joseph Smithers - trumpet
 Bob Suttman - trombone
 T.J. Tindall - guitar
 John Valentino - trumpet, shaker
 Fred Washington - bass
 Walter White - trumpet
 Dee Dee Wilde - background vocals
 Betty Wright - background vocals
 Earl Young - drums
 Jimmy Young - bass

Production
 Arranger: Terry Burrus, Dave Darlington, Charlie Ernst, Kenny Gamble, Doug Grigsby, Reginald Hines, The Kerber Brothers, Karen Manno, Gene Page, Kenny Pollack, Jonathan Rosen, Dexter Wansel.
 Rhythm Arrangements: Dave Darlington, Charlie Ernst, Doug Grigsby, Kenny Pollack, Reginald Hines, Manny Lopez.
 Vocal Arrangement: Karen Manno.
 String Arrangements: The Kerber Brothers, Gene Page.
 Horn Arrangements: The Kerber Brothers.

Charts

Weekly charts

Year-end charts

References

External links
 

1991 albums
Philadelphia International Records albums
Phyllis Hyman albums
Albums arranged by Gene Page
Albums produced by Kenneth Gamble
Zoo Entertainment (record label) albums